ILC may refer to:

Organisations
 ILC Dover, American engineering and manufacturing company
 Immanuel Lutheran College (disambiguation), multiple schools
 Independent Learning Centre, provider of distance education in Ontario, Canada
 Indigenous Land Corporation, former name of the Indigenous Land and Sea Corporation, Australia
 Indigenous Law Centre, at the University of New South Wales, Sydney, Australia
 Industrial loan company/corporation, a financial institution in the US that lends money
 International Labor Comparisons, division in the US Bureau of Labor Statistics
 International Labour Conference of the International Labour Organization
 International Law Commission, a body of legal experts
 International Land Coalition, a global social equity alliance
 International Lutheran Council, an association of Lutheran denominations
 Interprovincial Lottery Corporation in Canada
 Irish Land Commission, 1881–1999

Science and technology 
 Innate lymphoid cell, part of the immune system
 Invasive lobular carcinoma, a form of breast cancer
 International Linear Collider, a proposed particle accelerator

Other
 Illinois Compiled Statutes, codified statutes of Illinois
 In Living Color, an American comedy TV series
 Iterative learning control, a form of production-process tracking control